Elections to the French National Assembly were held in Mauritania on 2 January 1956. Mauritania had one seat in the Assembly, which was won by Sidi el-Mokhtar N'Diaye, a member of the Mauritanian Progressive Union.

Results

References

Mauritania
1956 in Mauritania
Elections in Mauritania
January 1956 events in Africa